The Symphony No. 97 in C major, Hoboken I/97, is the fifth of the twelve London symphonies (numbers 93-104) written by Joseph Haydn. It was completed in 1792 as part of the set of symphonies composed on his first trip to London. It was first performed at the Hanover Square Rooms in London on 3 or 4 May 1792. First published in England, it made its way to the continent a few years later and was used by Ludwig van Beethoven as a model for a symphony in C major he never completed, and by Friedrich Witt for the Jena Symphony.

Movements
The work is in standard four movement form and scored for two flutes, two oboes, two bassoons, two horns, two trumpets, timpani and strings.

Adagio — Vivace, 
Adagio ma non troppo,  in F major
Menuetto e Trio. Allegretto, 
Finale: Presto assai, 

After a slow introduction which deliberately avoids establishing C major, the main theme of the first movement is a fanfare that emphasizes the three notes of the C major triad.

The second subject is a Ländler that makes use of pizzicato in the bass.

The second movement is a set of F major variations with an irregular episode in F minor and a coda.  In the variation following the minore episode, Haydn used the unusual sul ponticello marking instructing the violins to play with the bow near the bridge creating a "glassy" or "metallic" sound.

For the final eight bars of the Trio of the minuet, Haydn instructs the concertmaster ("Salomon Solo" in the score) to play an octave above the rest of the first violins. Indeed, this minuet is extraordinary in Haydn's output: all of its repeats are written out because the scoring changes with each repeat.

A typical performance of the symphony lasts about 24 minutes.

References

External links
 

Symphony 097
1792 compositions
Stefan Zweig Collection
Compositions in C major